Aq Qui (also Romanized as Āq Qū’ī; also known as Aghoo’i, Aq Qūeh, and Āqū’ī) is a village in Qeshlaqat-e Afshar Rural District, Afshar District, Khodabandeh County, Zanjan Province, Iran. At the 2006 census, its population was 45, in 7 families.

References 

Populated places in Khodabandeh County